The 2011 Shanghai Rolex Masters was a men's tennis tournament  played on outdoor hard courts. It was the third edition of the Shanghai ATP Masters 1000, classified as an ATP World Tour Masters 1000 event on the 2011 ATP World Tour. It took place at Qizhong Forest Sports City Arena in Shanghai, China. This edition was held from 10 October through 16 October 2011. Second-seeded Andy Murray won the singles title.

Points and prize money

Point distribution

Prize money

Entrants

Seeds

 Rankings are as of October 3, 2011.

Other entrants
The following players received wildcards into the singles main draw:
  Gong Maoxin 
  Li Zhe
  David Nalbandian
  Zhang Ze

The following players received entry from the qualifying draw:

  Stéphane Bohli
  Matthew Ebden
  Ryan Harrison
  Marsel İlhan
  Lu Yen-hsun
  Albert Ramos
  Donald Young

Withdrawals
  Juan Martín del Potro
  Novak Djokovic (ruptured back muscle)
  Roger Federer (fatigue)
  Richard Gasquet (elbow injury)
  John Isner (illness)
  Gaël Monfils (knee injury)
  Robin Söderling (mono)

Finals

Singles

 Andy Murray defeated  David Ferrer, 7–5, 6–4
It was Murray's 5th title of the year and 21st of his career. It was his 2nd Masters of the year and 8th of his career. He defended his title.

Doubles

 Max Mirnyi /  Daniel Nestor defeated  Michaël Llodra /  Nenad Zimonjić, 3–6, 6–1, [12–10]

References

External links
Official website

 
Shanghai ATP Masters 1000
Shanghai Rolex Masters
Shanghai Rolex Masters
Shanghai Masters (tennis)